The Plaza de la Independencia (Independence Square) is a central square in the Spanish capital, Madrid. It sits at the intersection of Calle de Alcalá (running from east to west), Calle de Alfonso XII (to the south),  Calle de Serrano (to the north), Calle de Salustiano Olozaga (to the northwest), and the Paseo de Mexico (to the southeast, running entirely within the Buen Retiro Park). Being centred with the 18th-century gate of Puerta de Alcalá, the Plaza de la Independencia is among the important symbols of the city of Madrid.

The square was opened in 1778 during the reign of King Carlos III. It was designed by architect Francesco Sabatini. However, the current shape of the square dates back to 1869. It is mainly surrounded with buildings from the late nineteenth and early twentieth centuries, built during the expansion of the city of Madrid.

References

Calle de Alcalá
Independencia
Independencia